The name Popp may refer to:

 Adelheid Popp (1869–1939), Austrian feminist
 André Popp (1924–2014), French composer, arranger and screenwriter
 Angela C. Popp (born 1968), American director, screenwriter and songwriter
 Alexander Popp (born 1976), German tennis player
 Alexandra Popp (born 1991), German football player
 Bernard Ferdinand Popp (1917–2014), American Bishop of the Roman Catholic Church
 Bill Popp (1877–1909), American baseball player
 Cynthia J. Popp (born 1962),  American television director and producer
 Deborah Ann Popp (born 1993), American actress
 Franz Josef Popp (1886–1954), Founder of BMW
 Fritz Popp (born 1940), German football player
 Fritz-Albert Popp (born 1938), German biophysicist
  (1861–1943), German chemist and a pioneer of the discipline of forensic science
 Harold Popp (1903-1969), American pharmacist, businessman, and politician
 Jim Popp (born 1964), manager of the Montreal Alouettes football club
 Julius Popp (born 1973), German artist
 Lothar Popp (1887–1980), German revolutionary
 Lucia Popp (1939–1993), Slovak opera singer
 Mișu Popp (1827–1892), Romanian painter and muralist
 Nathaniel (Popp) (born 1940), Romanian-American bishop
 Wolfgang Popp (born 1959), German tennis player
 Carol Szathmari (1812–1887), called Carol Popp de Szathmary in Romanian; painter and photographer
 Chelsea Popp (born 1989), NYC Socialite

German-language surnames
Surnames from given names